, aka Ken-P, is a composer/conductor/orchestrator/clinician of media music (Film/TV/Game) and concert music (Symphonic and Choral). His works have been broadcast, performed, and recorded in North and South America, Asia, and Europe by well-known groups including the London Symphony Orchestra, Philharmonia Orchestra and Sydney Symphony Orchestra. In 2005, he was appointed a resident composer/assistant conductor of the Torrance Symphony. He is also a frequent guest conductor and lecturer for various workshops and reading sessions on choral music and composition/orchestration around the world.

Sato was born in Hamamatsu, Shizuoka, Japan, known as the city of music and instruments. He holds a Master of Music in Conducting (choral emphasis) with Distinction and a Bachelor of Music in Media and Commercial Writing from California State University, Northridge (CSUN). In addition to his degree in Music, he also holds degree in Cinema from Santa Monica College.

Musical style
His choral works, especially a cappella works, are full of rich and colorful harmony with sense of movement provided by individually moving vocal lines within closely voiced harmony. His works for symphony usually have bright and brilliant orchestration with clear sense of melody which is reflection of experience as a composer/orchestrator in Hollywood.

Musical works

Commercial music
Film: Baahubali 2: The Conclusion (Additional Music, Orchestration)
TV: A Christmas Prince: The Royal Wedding (Additional Music)
TV: The Bill Cunningham Show (Additional Music)
TV: The Dr. Oz Show (Additional Music)
TV: Judge Judy (Additional Music)
TV: Like, Share, Die (Additional Music)
TV: Primer Impacto (Additional Music)
TV: El Gordo y la Flaca (Additional Music)
TV: Brennpunkt (Additional Music)
TV: Madam Cutie On Duty (Additional Music)
TV: Alt for Norge (Additional Music)
Video Game: Elden Ring (Orchestration, Recording Director) FromSoftware
Video Game: Medal of Honor: European Assault (Orchestration) Electronic Arts
Video Game: Tom Clancy's Ghost Recon Advanced Warfighter(Orchestration) Ubisoft
Video Game: Tom Clancy's Ghost Recon Advanced Warfighter 2(Orchestration) Ubisoft
Video Game: Dissidia 012 Final Fantasy (Orchestration and Lyrics) Square Enix
Video Game: Dissidia Final Fantasy (2015 video game) (Orchestration, Lyrics and Conducting) Square Enix
Video Game: Final Fantasy Type-0 (Additional Music Composition, Orchestration and Lyrics) Square Enix
Video Game: Final Fantasy IV Pixel Remaster (Vocal Recording Director) Square Enix
Video Game: Final Fantasy Agito (Additional Music Arrangement and Lyrics) Square Enix
Video Game: GRAN SAGA (Orchestration) NPIXEL, Gameplex
Video Game: Kurokishi-to Shiro-no Mao (Orchestration) Grani, Mynet Games
Video Game: Becoming Bytes (Music) Chariots Gaming
Video Game: Avalon Code Title Song "Deep Forest" (Arrangement) Matrix Software
Album Record: Wonderful World by Israel "Iz" Kamakawiwoʻole  (Orchestration)
Album Record: Symphonic Tale: The Rune of Beginning (Music from Suikoden II (Orchestration, Conducting, Music Direction) performed by Budapest Symphony Orchestra.
Album Record: Symphonic Tale: An Unforgettable Journey (Music from Grandia (Orchestration, Conducting, Music Direction) performed by Budapest Symphony Orchestra.

Symphonic music
Symphonic Tale: Peter Pan
1.  The Boy Who Won’t Grow Up / The Peter Pan’s Fanfare
2.  Wendy’s Kiss
3.  Tinker Bell / Flying to the Neverland
4.  Pirates of the Jolly Roger
5.  The Lost Boys
6.  Cinderella, Wendy's Story
7.  The Mermaids' Lagoon
8.  The Never Bird
9.  Dance of the Native Warriors
10. Memory of Mother
11. Hook or Me, This Time!
12. Return Home
Symphonic Tale: An Unforgettable Journey (Music from Grandia) *an arrangement work in 14 movements.
Symphonic Tale: The Rune of Beginning (Music from Suikoden II) *an arrangement work in 23 movements.
Wings of Dreams
The Wind of Grassland
Christmas Overture
Redlands Overture
Star Ocean Overture
Freedom Overture
A Gift from the Ocean
Going Home with You
The Great Voyages of Captain Little

Choral music
Missa pro Pace (Mass for Peace) – SATB divisi, Latin
1. Kyrie
2. Gloria
3. Sanctus
4. Agnus Dei
Phoenix – SATB, Orchestra (Chamber Orch. ver/Piano ver/Organ ver), Latin
1. Locus Felix (The Happy Place)
2. Avis Phoenix (Phoenix, the Bird)
3. Mors et Resurrectio Phoenicis (Death and Resurrection of the Phoenix)
4. Carmen Phoenici (Song to the Phoenix)
Requiem Pacis (Requiem of Peace) – SATB, Soprano Solo, and Chamber Orchestra (Piano ver/Organ ver), Latin
1. Requiem Aeternam et Kyrie
2. Sanctus
3. Agnus Dei et Lux Aeterna
4. Subvenite
5. In Paradisum
Te Deum – SATB, Organ or Piano, Percussions Latin
1. Te Deum Laudamus
2. Te Gloriosus
3. Tu Rex Gloriae
4. Te Ergo Quaesmus
5. Salvum Fac
Veni Sancte Spiritus – SMA, Orchestra ver./Organ ver./Piano ver., Latin
1. Veni et Emite
2. Consolator Optime
3. O Lux Beatissima (This movement is a cappella)
4. Da Tuis Fidelibus
Missa Trinitas – SSA, divisi, Latin
1. Kyrie
2. Gloria
3. Sanctus
4. Benedictus
5. Agnus Dei
Cantata Amoris (Cantata of Love) – SATB divisi, Latin
1. Sectamini Caritatem
2. Diligamus Invicem
3. Nihil Sum
4. Deus Caritas Est
Arbor Mundi (World Tree|世界樹) – TTBB and Piano, Latin
1. Expergisci (Awakening|目覚め)
2. Strepitus Candidi (White Noises|白いざわめき)
3. Hasta Fulminea (Spear of Lightning|光の槍)
4. Carmen Imbris (Song of Rain|雨の歌)
5. Sensus (A Sensation|思い)
6. Carmen Arboris Mundi (World Tree Song|世界樹の歌)
Fabulae Persei (Tales of Perseus|ペルセウス物語) – TTBB, Organ or Piano with optional Percussions and Narration, Latin
1. Perseus Iuvenis (The Young Perseus|若きペルセウス)
2. Eius Die Natali (On His Birthday|誕生日に)
3. Typhon (Typhon|テュポーン)
4. Imprecatio (The Curse|呪い)
5. Epistula Andromedae (Andromeda's Letter|アンドロメダの手紙)
6. Arma Deorum (Arms from the Gods|神々の武具)
7. Medusa (Medusa|メドゥーサ)
8. Pegasus, Equus Ales (Pegasus, a Whinged Horse|天馬ペガサス)
9. Proelium cum Typhone (Battle with Typhon|テュポーンとの戦い)
10. Perseus Heros (The Hero Perseus|英雄ペルセウス)
Laetentur Caeli (Let the Heavens be Glad) – SATB and String Orchestra (Piano ver./Organ ver.), Latin
1. Laetitia
2. Misericordia
3. Iustitia
Three Love Song set – SATB divisi, English
1. Love in the Sky
2. Love in Bloom
3. Love on Fire
In Laude Iesu – SATB, Latin
1. Ne Timeas, Maria
2. Lux Fulgebit
3. Ave Verum Corpus
4. O Filii et Filiae
Ireland, a little bit of Heaven – SATB, English
1. An Irish Lullaby
2. Who Threw the Overalls in Mistress Murphy's Chowder
3. The Kerry Dance
4. Danny Boy
Uta'ngoe-wa Kawarazu (Singing Unchanged|歌声は変わらず) – SATB, Piano, Japanese
1. Uta-nga Kikoeru (I Hear a Song|歌が聞こえる)
2. Ano Koro (Those days|あの頃)
3. Kyo-mo Dokokade(Somewhere　|今日もどこかで)
Ako'ngare-to Tomoni (With Adoration|憧れと共に) – TTBB/SATB, Piano, Japanese
1. Uta-ni Ako'ngarete (Falling in Love with Singing|歌に憧れて)
2. On'ngaku-ni Na'tte (Music Coming to Be|音楽になって)
3. Ke'tsui(Determination|決意)
4. Boku-nga Utau Wake(Why I Sing|僕が歌う理由<わけ>)
5. Boku-no Uta-nga Tsu'dzukuwake(Why My Music Continues|僕の歌が続く理由<わけ>)
Kisetsu-no Shiori (Bookmarks of Four Seasons|季節のしおり) -SATB divisi, Japanese
1. Haru-no Ashioto (Spring's Footsteps|春の足音)
2. Natsu-no Enongu (Summer's Paints|夏の絵具)
3. Aki-no Kangee(Autumn's Shadow Pictures|秋の影絵)
4. Huyu-no Ibuki (Winter's Breath|冬の息吹)
Umingame-no Uta (Sea Turtle Songs|ウミガメの唄) – SA&SATB Piano, Japanese
1. Shiroi Kibo(White Hopes|白い希望)
2. Yozora-no Tsubuyaki (Whispers of the Night Sky|夜空のつぶやき)
3. Tsukiyo-no Tabidachi(Departure in the Moonlit Night|月夜の旅立ち)
4. Shiroi Kiseki (White Miracle|白い奇跡)
Bungaku-e (To Literature|文学へ) – SMA, Piano, Japanese, Narration
1. Asa-no Hujidana (|朝の藤棚)
2. Bozu (|ぼうず)
3. Tabi-ni(|旅に)
4. Kimi-ga Mita Sora (|君が見た空)
Hajimariwa Itsumo　(Always Start Anew|はじまりは、いつも) – SA, Piano, Japanese
1. Sorano Staatorain (A Starting Line on the Sky|空のスタートライン)
2. Mata, Ashita (Tomorrow Again|また、あした)
3. Dekita! (I Did it!|できた！)
Kokoro-no Umi-e　(An Ocean Within|こころの海へ) – SA, Piano, Japanese
1. Aozora-no Kujira (A Whale in the Blue Sky|青空のクジラ)
2. Yumemiru Kurage (A Dreaming Jellyfish|夢見るクラゲ)
3. Yuki-no Kaze-wo (Winds of Courage|勇気の風を)
Boku-no Kioku-no Dokokani (Somewhere in My Memory|僕の記憶のどこかに) – SATB/SA/SAB and Piano, Japanese
Haru-no Ogawa (A Spring's Stream|春の小川)
Ware-wa Uminoko (A Child of the Ocean|われは海の子)
Mushi-no Koe (Bugs' Chorus in Autumn|虫の声)
Yuki-no Omoide (Memory of Snow|雪の思い出)
Yozora-no Kioku-no Dokokani (|夜空の記憶のどこかに) – SA and Piano, Japanese
Hoshi-wa Nani-wo (|星は何を)
Tanabata-no Omoi (|七夕の想い)
Hanabi-to Tsuki-to (|花火と月と)
Oborozukiyo-no Namida (|朧月夜の涙)
Ave Maria in C – SATB divisi, Latin
Ave Maria in F – SSA and Piano, Latin
Ave Regina Caerolum – SSA and Piano, Latin
Ave Maris Stella – SATB divisi, Latin
Carmen Laetitiae (Song of Joy)　– SSA, divisi, Latin
O Sacrum Convivium　– SATB, Latin
Nascatur Pax (Let Peace be Born) – SATB, divisi, Latin
Ortus Carminis (Arising of Song) – SATB, optional Piano, Latin
How Do I Love You? – SATB divisi, English
'Tween Dusk and Dreams – SATB divisi, English
Newborn Joy (Angels We Have Heard on High) – SATB and Piano, English
Sweet Days – SATB　or TTBB English
Little Star of Bethlehem – SATB, English
Then Christmas Comes – TB divisi, English
Whispered Secrets – SATB and Piano, English
Innocence – SATB and Piano, English
Fanfare for Tomorrow – SATB, Brass and Percussion, English
Love's Philosophy – SATB and Piano, English-
Prends Cette Rose (Receive This Rose) – SATB and Piano, French
Wakaba-no Omoi (|若葉の想い) – SATB/SMA, Japanese
Omoide-wo Hiraite (Opening Our Memories|思い出をひらいて) – SA&SATB Piano, Japanese
Kasanaru Koe-ni (|かさなる声に)-SATB/SMA/TBB, a cappella or Piano, Japanese
Chorus! (Korasu!|コーラス！)-SATB divisi, Japanese
Ima (This Moment|いま) – SAB and Piano, Japanese
Engao-no Maho (Magic of Smile|笑顔の魔法) – SATB with Optional Piano, Japanese
Tsunangari (Connection|つながり) – SA, SSAA, TTBB, SAB and/or SATB with Optional Piano, Japanese
Mae-e (Forward|前へ) – SA, SSAA, TTBB, SAB and/or SATB with Optional Piano, Japanese
Forever Forward – SATB with Optional Piano, Japanese
Teppen-eno Michi (The Road|天辺への道|) – SATB, a cappella, Japanese
Saijyo Sakezukuri-uta Imayo (|西条酒造り歌今様|) – SATB, a cappella or Piano, Japanese
O Christmas Tree – TTBB, English 
Silent Noon – SATB and Piano, English – Music by R. Vaughan Williams, Cho. Arr. by Kentaro Sato
Nbaba Rabusongu (Nbaba Love Song|んばば・ラブソング) – SA and Piano, Japanese, Cho. Arr. by Kentaro Sato
Tenohira-wo Taiyo-ni (手のひらを太陽に) – SA and Piano, Japanese) Cho.Arr. by Kentaro Sato
Anpanman-no March (アンパンマンのマーチ) – SA and Piano, Japanese) Cho.  Arr. by Kentaro Sato

Musical
Tenkochan-no Sotsugyoshiki (Graduation of Little Tenko|テンコちゃんの卒業式)
Pica-mu's Wonder Story (Musical)
Niji-no Kakehashi (Musical)
Himitsu-no Takaramono (Musical)

Awards and honors

Winner of the 25th Anniversary Composition Contest hosted by the Choral Arts Ensemble of Rochester, MN (2008).
2nd Prize of the 2008 Singing City Choral Composition Contest
Recipient of the 2006 ASCAP Foundation David Rose Award from the 2006 ASCAP Film Scoring Workshop.
Winner of The 2005 Raymond W. Brock Memorial Composition Contest hosted by Winner of ACDA, American Choral Directors Association
Winner of the 26th Annual Choral Composition Contest presented by Ithaca College and Theodore Presser Company for the performance of his "How Do I Love You?" by the West Genesee High School Chorale, led by Anthony Alvaro in 2005.
The 2nd Prize of the GPO Orchestration Competition (2005)
2004-2005 Outstanding bachelor's degree Graduate Award in Music from California State University, Northridge (2005)
The 3rd Prize of the 5th Enterbrain Game Contest for Original Music (2001) 
The Grand Prize of the 2nd Omnibus Town Award (2000)

Discography
"Kentaro Sato: Japanese Choral Works for Mixed Voices, Vol. 1" (CLASSICAL NOVA): 2019
"Kentaro Sato: Japanese Choral Works for Mixed Voices, Vol. 2" (CLASSICAL NOVA): 2019
"Symphonic Tale: The Rune of Beginning (Music from Suikoden II)" (CLASSICAL NOVA): 2019
"Maria Mater" performed by Vocalia Taldea (NB Musica): 2010
"Kantika Sakra" performed by Kantika Korala (NB Musica): 2010
"Film Design Box 4, Symphonic Tale of Peter Pan" performed by FILMharmonic Orchestra (Fontana Music Library): 2008
"Then Christmas Comes" performed by Brethren (Brethren Group): 2007
"Truth" from the 5th single CD "Changin'" by Stephanie (Sony Music Entertainment)

External links
Official site

1981 births
21st-century American composers
21st-century American male musicians
21st-century classical composers
21st-century Japanese composers
American classical composers
American male classical composers
California State University, Northridge alumni
Japanese classical composers
Japanese emigrants to the United States
Japanese male classical composers
Living people
Musicians from Shizuoka Prefecture
People from Hamamatsu